The 1970–71 NBA season was the 76ers 22nd season in the NBA and 8th season in Philadelphia. They improved to a record of 47–35. In the playoffs, they lost a hard fought series with the Baltimore Bullets 4-3, who represented the Eastern Conference in the Finals. This was the final season for forward Bailey Howell, who was signed by Philadelphia & was a vital part in 2  Celtics championships in 1968 and 1969.

The Sixers also tried a new uniform style. Instead of the traditional PHILA in block lettering, they used a design that wrote out Seventy Sixers in cursive writing. These uniforms did not last the entire year.

Offseason

Draft picks

This table only displays picks through the second round.

Roster

Regular season

Season standings

z – clinched division title
y – clinched division title
x – clinched playoff spot

Record vs. opponents

Game log

Playoffs

|- align="center" bgcolor="#ccffcc"
| 1
| March 24
| @ Baltimore
| W 126–112
| Hal Greer (30)
| Luke Jackson (13)
| Archie Clark (7)
| Baltimore Civic Center6,707
| 1–0
|- align="center" bgcolor="#ffcccc"
| 2
| March 26
| Baltimore
| L 107–119
| Archie Clark (26)
| Billy Cunningham (11)
| Archie Clark (6)
| Spectrum10,369
| 1–1
|- align="center" bgcolor="#ffcccc"
| 3
| March 28
| @ Baltimore
| L 103–111
| Hal Greer (30)
| Billy Cunningham (19)
| Billy Cunningham (10)
| Baltimore Civic Center5,589
| 1–2
|- align="center" bgcolor="#ffcccc"
| 4
| March 30
| Baltimore
| L 105–120
| Archie Clark (24)
| Billy Cunningham (17)
| Billy Cunningham (8)
| Spectrum8,909
| 1–3
|- align="center" bgcolor="#ccffcc"
| 5
| April 1
| @ Baltimore
| W 104–103
| Billy Cunningham (32)
| Billy Cunningham (20)
| Hal Greer (6)
| Baltimore Civic Center10,998
| 2–3
|- align="center" bgcolor="#ccffcc"
| 6
| April 3
| Baltimore
| W 98–94
| Billy Cunningham (33)
| Billy Cunningham (16)
| Billy Cunningham (5)
| Spectrum7,059
| 3–3
|- align="center" bgcolor="#ffcccc"
| 7
| April 4
| @ Baltimore
| L 120–128
| Archie Clark (37)
| Billy Cunningham (19)
| Clark, Greer (5)
| Baltimore Civic Center6,662
| 3–4
|-

Awards and records
Billy Cunningham, All-NBA First Team

References

Philadelphia
Philadelphia 76ers seasons
Philadel
Philadel